Bittacus carpenteri is a species of hanging fly in the Order Mecoptera. Its native range is the Sichuan Province of China.  The specific epithet honors Professor Frank M. Carpenter.

References

Bittacus
Endemic fauna of China
Insects described in 1957